The following lists events that happened during 1929 in the Union of Soviet Socialist Republics.

Incumbents
 General Secretary of the Communist Party of the Soviet Union – Joseph Stalin
 Chairman of the Central Executive Committee of the Congress of Soviets – Mikhail Kalinin
 Chairman of the Council of People's Commissars of the Soviet Union – Alexei Rykov

Events

February
9 February – Litvinov's Pact is signed.
17 February – The Case of the Union of Liberation of Belarus begins.

May
1 May – 1929 Kopet Dag earthquake

July
22 July – 9 September – Sino-Soviet conflict (1929)

Births
11 January – Dmitri Bruns, Estonian architect (d. 2020)
14 January – Vladimir Kondrashin, basketball coach (d. 1999)
30 March – Ilya Piatetski-Shapiro, mathematician
18 May – Halyna Sevruk, artist (d. 2022)
21 May – Boris Seidenberg, actor
5 June – Sergo Mikoyan, historian
7 July – Yakov Lyubarsky, scholar
18 August – Anatoly Kuznetsov, writer
15 October – Nikodim, Soviet Russian Orthodox metropolitan (d. 1978)
22 October –  Lev Yashin, footballer
15 December – Yuri Vasilyevich Prokhorov, mathematician
23 December – Antonina Seredina, Olympic canoeist

Deaths 
11 January – Yakov Slashchov, White Army general (born 1885)
18 March – Hamza Hakimzade Niyazi, Uzbek author, composer, playwright, poet, scholar, and political activist (born 1889)
not earlier than 15 April – Panteleimon Belochub, Ukrainian soldier (born 1892)

See also
1929 in fine arts of the Soviet Union
List of Soviet films of 1929

References

 
1920s in the Soviet Union
Years in the Soviet Union
Soviet Union
Soviet Union
Soviet Union